To Please One Woman is a 1920 American silent drama film produced and directed by Lois Weber and starring Claire Windsor. It was distributed by Famous Players-Lasky and Paramount Pictures.

Plot
The film is a take on the "vamp" genre by pioneer Lois Weber, just as that genre was waning.

Cast
Claire Windsor as Alice Granville
Edith Kessler as Cecilia Granville
George Hackathorne as Freddy
Edmund Burns as Dr. John Ransome
Mona Lisa as Leila
Howard Gaye as Leila's Husband
Lee Shumway as Lucien Wainwright (credited as L.C. Shumway)
Gordon Griffith as Bobby Granville

uncredited
Frank Coghlan Jr. as (credited as Junior Coghlan)
Esther Ralston

Preservation status
A print may exist in the Library of Congress collection. The Library of Congress online database shows no listing and may need to be updated if a print does exist.

References

External links

 

1920 films
American silent feature films
Films directed by Lois Weber
Paramount Pictures films
American black-and-white films
Silent American drama films
1920 drama films
1920s American films